Peter Vale is a senior research fellow at the Centre for the Advancement of Scholarship at the University of Pretoria, South Africa, and the Nelson Mandela Professor of Politics Emeritus at Rhodes University, South Africa. He is also an honorary professor at the Africa Earth Observatory Network (AEON) of which he was a founding member. Notably, Vale was the founding director of the Johannesburg Institute for Advanced Study (JIAS) and acting vice-rector for academic affairs and deputy vice-chancellor of the University of the Western Cape, South Africa.

Early life and education
Born in Duiwelskloof (now Modjadjiskloof), he matriculated from Capricorn High School in 1965 (where he was Headboy) and went on to read for a Bachelor of Arts and thereafter an honours degree in international relations at the University of the Witwatersrand (Wits), Johannesburg - graduating in 1973. Vale then completed his Master of Arts in comparative politics at Leicester University, United Kingdom, in 1977 and took a PhD from the same institution in 1981.

Career
Vale started his career as a financial journalist in 1971; whereafter, he moved into academia and served as the assistant director of the South African Institute of International Affairs (SAIIA). He then went on to work as a research fellow at the International Institute for Strategic Studies in the United Kingdom and, later, took up a lectureship in the Department of International Relations at Wits. In 1981 Vale returned to SAIIA as the director of research. In 1983, he was appointed as the director of the Institute for Social and Economic Research at Rhodes University and, later, the Centre for Southern African Studies at the University of the Western Cape (UWC) which he founded. Vale served as the acting vice-rector for academic affairs and deputy vice-chancellor at UWC between 1999 and 2001. He, thereafter, became a senior professor in the School of Government at UWC, before returning to Rhodes University as the Nelson Mandela Chair of Politics.

Vale chaired the Academy Advisory Board of The Stellenbosch Institute for Advanced Study (STIAS) between 2011 and 2016, and the ASSAf Standing Committee on the Humanities. Between 2008 and 2011, he co-chaired (with Jonathan Jansen) the first inquiry into the "state" of the Humanities in South Africa for the Academy of Science of South Africa (ASSAf).
Among visiting appointments, he has been UNESCO Professor of African Studies at Utrecht University, the Netherlands; a Fellow at the International Centre for Advanced Studies, New York University; and professor of politics, Macquarie University, Sydney, Australia. Vale has been a visiting professor at the University of Bergen, Norway, too.

Vale has been honoured with the International Medal of the University of Utrecht and Rhodes University’s Distinguished Senior Research Award. His 2003 book, Security and Politics in South Africa: The Regional Dimension, received the Vice-Chancellor’s Book Award at Rhodes University. He is an elected member of the Academy of Science of South Africa (MASSAf), a Fellow of the Royal Society of South Africa (FRSSAf), Lid van Die Akademie vir Wetenskap en Kuns (LAkadSA), Fellow of the World Academy for Arts and Science (FWAAS) and a Fellow of the African Academy of Science (FAAS). In 2013, Vale delivered the E.H. Carr Memorial Lecture at Aberystwyth University, Wales, which is considered to be the most prestigious lecture in the field of International Relations. He is the recipient of the Lifetime Achievement Award by the Political Science Association of South Africa.

Vale’s research interests included social thought, intellectual traditions, the future and politics of higher education and the history of International Relations. He has published (and co-published) extensively - 75 chapters; 70 journal pieces and over 100 in grey literature or on the www. His journal work has appeared in Foreign Affairs, International Relations, International Affairs, International Politics, Millennium, African Sociological Review, Contemporary Politics, Global Society, The Round Table, Thesis Eleven, Arts and Humanities in Higher Education amongst other places.

Most recently, he has published a chapter on cartoons and Afrikaner Nationalism, and a co-authored book (with Dr Vineet Thakur) on the South African origins of the field on International Relations. His co-edited books include South African Intellectual Traditions (with Lawrence Hamilton and Estelle H Prinsloo), Critical Perspectives on South Africa after 20 years of democracy (with Estelle H. Prinsloo), and Political Studies in South Africa (with Pieter Fourie). Vale has been an energetic contributor to public debate in South Africa and elsewhere.

Family
Peter Vale is married to the educationalist and activist Louise Carol Vale (born Kramer). The couple live in Schoenmakerskop, Eastern Cape, South Africa, and have two children - Dr. Beth Vale, a medical anthropologist, and Daniel Vale, a technology lawyer.

References

University of the Witwatersrand alumni
Members of the Academy of Science of South Africa
Year of birth missing (living people)
Living people